Schley (pronounced Shly) is an unincorporated community, in Orange County, North Carolina, United States, located southwest of Caldwell and northeast of Hillsborough. It lies at an elevation of 584 feet (178 m).

One of the main landmarks in the area is the Schley Grange Hall at the intersection of Hwy 57 and Schley Road.
Schley has a very active farming community.

References

Unincorporated communities in Orange County, North Carolina
Unincorporated communities in North Carolina